Islamic Association of Iranian Medical Society is an Iranian reformist political party affiliated with the Council for Coordinating the Reforms Front.

Members 
 Mohammad Farhadi
 Abolfazl Soroush
 Mehdi Khazali
 Gholamreza Ansari
 Mostafa Moein
 Ali Shakouri-Rad

Party leaders

References

External links 
 Official website

Reformist political groups in Iran
1993 establishments in Iran
Political parties established in 1993
Medical associations based in Iran